John Earl Washington (born February 20, 1963) is a former American football defensive end in the National Football League (NFL) between 1986 and 1993 for the New York Giants and the New England Patriots.  He played college football at Oklahoma State University and was drafted in the third round of the 1986 NFL Draft.

One of his biggest contributions to the game while playing for the Giants was making a goal line stand in a 1990 divisional playoff game versus the Chicago Bears. On 4th and goal at the Giants' 1 yard line, Washington eluded a blocker and stuffed fullback Brad Muster. His stop prevented the Bears from cutting into the Giants' 10-0 second quarter lead and the Giants cruised the rest of the way to a 31-3 victory en route to their second Super Bowl championship. 

1963 births
Living people
American football defensive ends
Oklahoma State Cowboys football players
Players of American football from Houston
New York Giants players
Atlanta Falcons players
New England Patriots players